Papuan is an adjective referring to:
 anything related to New Guinea, a large island north of Australia
 anything related to one or another of the countries or territories on this island that are specifically known as Papua
 Papuan languages, a geographic group comprising a large number of the languages of New Guinea
 Papuans, the indigenous peoples of New Guinea

See also 
 
 Papua (disambiguation)

Language and nationality disambiguation pages